Walther Rehm (13 November 1901 – 6 December 1963) was a German literary scholar.

Life and family 
Afterwards he studied German language and literature, history and art history at the Ludwig Maximilian University of Munich.

In 1923, he received his doctorate with a thesis on the literary Renaissance image of the 18th and 19th centuries, and since 1929 he had been a private lecturer in the history of modern German literature in Munich. Due to blatantly expressed criticism of the National Socialist ideology and politics, planned appointments to Würzburg, Marburg/Lahn, Göttingen and Strasbourg failed. Entry into the NSDAP in 1942 as well as into the National Socialist Teachers League and the NS-Volkswohlfahrt were forced. However, the denazification process after 1945 proved difficult due to his party membership; he was only fully rehabilitated in 1950. 

After a temporary professorship, Rehm was permanent professor of modern German literary history at the University of Gießen from 1940. From 1943 until his death he taught at the Albert-Ludwigs-Universität Freiburg.

His son was the musicologist Wolfgang Rehm.

Rehm died in Freiburg im Breisgau at age 63.

Work 
During the National Socialist era, Rehm was able to free himself from the national zeitgeist in his scientific work by specifically addressing the unheroic, for example in the works of Dostoevsky, Kierkegaard and Jean Paul. His studies of the afterlife of antiquity remained particularly influential. (Greekism and Goethe's time) as well as on the veneration of the dead with Novalis, Hölderlin and Rilke  (Orpheus. The Poets and the Dead) Finally, he was also a historical-critical editor. He rendered special services to the edition of the letters from and to Johann Joachim Winckelmann.

Membership in societies and academies 
 1944: Member of the German Archaeological Institute 
 1956: Corresponding member of the Bayerische Akademie der Wissenschaften.
 Member of the Winckelmann Society in Stendal

Publications 
 Der Todesgedanke in der deutschen Dichtung vom Mittelalter bis zur Romantik. (1928)
 Der Renaissancekult um 1900 und seine Überwindung. (1929)
 Jacob Burckhardt (Biographie) by Walter Rehm . Verlag Huber Frauenfeld u. Leipzig 1930
 Der Untergang Roms im abendländischen Denken. (1930)
 Griechentum und Goethezeit. (1936)
 Europäische Romdichtung. (1939)
 Experimentum Medietatis. (1947)
 Kierkegaard und der Verführer. (1949)
 Orpheus. Die Dichter und die Toten. (1950)
 Götterstille und Göttertrauer. (1951). Essay collection
 Der Dichter und die neue Einsamkeit. (1969)

Further reading 
 Inge Auerbach: Catalogus professorum academiae Margburgensis. Second volume: 1910 bis 1971. Elwert, Marburg 1979, .
  Hans Peter Herrmann: Rehm, Walther. In Christoph König (ed.), in cooperation with Birgit Wägenbaur among others: Internationales Germanistenlexikon 1800–1950. Vol 3: R–Z. de Gruyter, Berlin/New York 2003, .
 .

External links 
 Walther Rehm auf der Webseite der Universität Gießen
 Nachruf von Hugo Kuhn (PDF-Datei)

References 

Germanists
Literary scholars
Academic staff of the University of Giessen
Academic staff of the University of Freiburg
Members of the Bavarian Academy of Sciences
Nazi Party members
1901 births
1963 deaths
People from Erlangen